The Auto Coach Building, at 1730-34 Oak St. in Kansas City, Missouri, was built in two phases in 1917 and 1926.  It was listed on the National Register of Historic Places in 2007.

It is a three-story, brick and stone, two part commercial block,  in plan.

It was part of Kansas City's "Automobile Row" which, in the early 1900s, included auto dealerships, parts suppliers, rubber tire manufacturers, and other automotive related firms.

References

National Register of Historic Places in Jackson County, Missouri
Late 19th and Early 20th Century American Movements architecture
Buildings and structures completed in 1926